Nicolas Robert Christian Lombaerts (born 20 March 1985) is a Belgian former professional footballer who played as a centre-back and current assistant manager of K.A.A. Gent.

Career

Club

Brugge
Lombaerts joined Club Brugge at young age where he went through all youth ranks. He claimed various league titles at young age as he was part of a strong generation at Brugge, with players such as Jason Vandelannoite, Glenn Verbauwhede and Thomas Matton.

Gent
As his ambition was to play in the starting lineup of a first division team as soon as possible and Club Brugge was not able to guarantee this, he moved to Gent where he soon was able to play almost every match in the 2005–06 Belgian First Division and also got his first appearance for the Belgium national football team. Apart from football, he was at that point still studying law at Ghent University. Several times he was selected for the Belgian national youth teams such as the Belgium national under-21 football team. Highlights were the 2004 UEFA European Under-19 Football Championship and the 2007 UEFA European Under-21 Football Championship.

Zenit

In July 2007, Lombaerts chose a lucrative transfer to the FC Zenit Saint Petersburg in Russia. At that point he quit his studies and chose for a football career. Zenit eventually won its first Russian league title with the 2007 Russian Premier League. At the beginning of 2008, Lombaerts was sidelined for over half a year as the result of a knee injury. He received knee injury in UEFA Cup game against Villarreal CF during the attack that led to the only away goal against the Spanish team. His actions in this game (goal assist by header) later on have been regarded by Zenit fans as one of the most important steps in the subsequent victory in UEFA Cup. In the following games without him, his team won the 2007–08 UEFA Cup and he also missed the 2008 Summer Olympics where Belgium finished fourth.

Lombaerts finally made his return to Zenit on 19 July 2009, coming on in the 71st minute for Aleksei Ionov against Terek Grozny. Even though Zenit were defeated 3-2, Lombaerts described the happiness of taking the pitch again as similar to "a small child's joy when walking into a shop full of sweets." He then quickly became a fixture in defense for caretaker Anatoliy Davydov, helping Zenit win six consecutive matches to get back into the title hunt. On 29 November 2009, Lombaerts scored the game-winning goal against rival Spartak Moscow to put Zenit into the 2010-11 UEFA Champions League as third-place team in Russia.

On 5 July 2010, Lombaerts signed a four-year contract to remain with Zenit.

Oostende
On 24 March 2017, it was announced that after 10 seasons with Zenit, Lombaerts will return to Belgium for 2017–18 season, signing with K.V. Oostende. He played his last, 289th official game for Zenit on 17 May 2017 in a game against FC Krasnodar and was honoured by the club.

On 30 July 2019 it was announced, that the club wanted to terminate his contract in exchange for a severance payment of 300,000 euros and was sent to the B-team. The club was in financial problems after owner Marc Coucke left the club, why they wanted to part ways with Lombaerts and his heavy wages.

International
He has made his debut in full internationals in May 2006 in a friendly against Saudi Arabia, and played 3 matches in Euro 2008 qualifying.

On 26 May 2014, in a pre-World Cup match against Luxembourg, Lombaerts came on as a substitute in the 77th minute for Jan Vertonghen. As Belgium had already made the 6 permitted substitutions, the match was therefore declared invalid on 4 June.

Coaching career
On 28 May 2021 it was confirmed, that Lombaerts would become the assistant manager of Hein Vanhaezebrouck at his former club K.A.A. Gent from the start of the 2021-22 season.

Career statistics

Club

International

Scores and results list Belgium's goal tally first, score column indicates score after each Lombaerts goal.

Career honours
Zenit St. Petersburg
Russian Premier League: 2007, 2010, 2011-12, 2014–15
Russian Cup: 2010
Russian Super Cup: 2008,  2011
UEFA Cup: 2007-08
UEFA Super Cup: 2008

Notes

External links
 Profile at the official FC Zenit St. Petersburg website
 
Belgium Stats at Belgian FA

1985 births
Living people
Flemish sportspeople
Footballers from Bruges
Association football defenders
Belgian footballers
Belgian expatriate footballers
Belgium youth international footballers
Belgium under-21 international footballers
Belgium international footballers
K.A.A. Gent players
FC Zenit Saint Petersburg players
UEFA Cup winning players
K.V. Oostende players
Russian Premier League players
Belgian Pro League players
2014 FIFA World Cup players
Belgian expatriate sportspeople in Russia
Expatriate footballers in Russia